Cooku with Comali, also known by the acronym CWC, is an Indian Tamil-language comedy-based cooking competition show aired on Star Vijay and streams on Disney+ Hotstar where the contestants are paired each week with comedians (comalis) who are amateur cooks. The first season premiered on 16 November 2019 and ended on 23 February 2020. The second season was premiered on 14 November 2020 and ended on 14 April 2021. The third season was premiered on 22 January 2022 and ended on 24 July 2022. The fourth season was premiered on 28 January 2023. The contestants along with their comalis are challenged every week and judged by Chef Damu and Chef Venkatesh Bhat.

Production

Game format 
Every week, the show starts with celebrity chefs getting paired with their Comalis. Then the teams compete in Advantage Task 1 and Task 2. The teams then compete in Main Task and Immunity/Elimination Task. The Advantage task involves a minimal task in which a team does a small task and the winner of the Advantage task is given an advantage during the main task where the team can choose a time frame to work without any obstacles. During the Main task, every team is given a challenge or an obstacle that will make the cooking harder. The teams are given a specific time limit where they must cook with that time frame. Most of the cooking tasks are to be done by Comalis. The cook that gets Immunity is safe from next week's elimination and does not participate in that week. Some week are celebration rounds with no elimination.

Overview

Reception
The series gained popularity only during its re - telecast in the COVID-19 lockdown in 2020. Following which the launch of the second season became one of the top rated Tamil reality television program both on television and on the digital platform Hotstar.

The grand finale of season 2 aired on 14 April 2021 for 6 hours garnered a high viewership rating of 11.1 TVR in urban and 8.1 TVR overall with 6.58 million impressions.

Adaptations

References

External links
Cooku With Comali on IMDb

Star Vijay original programming
Tamil-language television shows
Tamil-language reality television series
Tamil-language cooking television series
Tamil-language comedy television series
2019 Tamil-language television series debuts
2019 Tamil-language television seasons
2020 Tamil-language television seasons
2022 Tamil-language television seasons
Television shows set in Tamil Nadu